Emotiv Systems is an Australian electronics innovation company developing technologies to evolve human computer interaction incorporating non-conscious cues into the human-computer dialog to emulate human to human interaction. Developing brain–computer interfaces (BCIs) based on electroencephalography (EEG) technology, Emotiv Systems produced the EPOC near headset, a peripheral targeting the gaming market for Windows, OS X and Linux platforms. The EPOC has 16 electrodes and was originally designed to work as a BCI input device.

The company was founded in 2003 by technology entrepreneurs Tan Le, Nam Do, Allan Snyder, and Neil Weste. However, doing a search of business entity name on Emotiv Systems at the business entity registry of the California Secretary of State reveals Emotiv Systems has ceased to exist, and, therefore, it should not be mixed up or confused with the currently active U.S. bioinformatics company Emotiv founded by Tan Le in 2011 in which Nam Do, Allan Snyder, and Neil Weste have no ownerships nor roles.

See also
 Electroencephalography
 Neurofeedback
 Comparison of consumer brain–computer interfaces

References

External links
 Tan Le: A headset that reads your thoughts
 Brain control headset for gamers, By Darren Waters, 20 February 2008, BBC News
 Reality Bites -- Emotiv -- Mind Reading Device, By David H. Freedman, 1 December 2008, Inc. Magazine profile

Brain–computer interfacing
Companies established in 2003
2003 establishments in Australia